A Life Interrupted is a 2007 Lifetime Television film directed by Stefan Pleszczynski and starring Lea Thompson. It was nominated in 2008 for the Best TV Movie Gemini Award. It depicts events in the life of sexual assault victim Debbie Smith, which led to the passage of  the Debbie Smith Act. in 2004.

On March 3, 1989, a man wearing a ski mask entered Debbie Smith's home in Williamsburg, Virginia, and threatened her with a gun.  He then dragged her into the woods and blindfolded her, before raping her repeatedly over the next hour. She participated in the collection of DNA evidence for a sexual assault evidence kit, but it was not formally tested and entered into the national criminal database until 1994. The film follows Debbie's fight for justice.

Cast
 Lea Thompson as Debbie Smith
 Anthony Lemke as Rob Smith
 Cindy Busby as Crystal Smith
Eleonore Lamothe as Young Crystal
 Tommy Lioutas as Bobby Smith
 Devon Bostick as Young Bobby

References

External links

Canadian drama television films
English-language Canadian films
Lifetime (TV network) films
2007 television films
2007 films
2000s Canadian films